The metropolitan areas of Mexico have been traditionally defined as the group of municipalities that heavily interact with each other, usually around a core city. The phenomenon of metropolization in Mexico is relatively recent, starting in the 1940s, and due to the accelerated level of urbanization in the country, the definition of a metropolitan area (Mexican Spanish: zona metropolitana) is reviewed periodically by the Mexican population and census authorities.

Methodology 

One of the first studies on a methodology to define and quantify the metropolitan areas in the country was published by El Colegio de México in 1978. In Luis Unikel's book "Urban Development in Mexico: Diagnosis and Future Implications", a metropolitan area was designated as "the territorial area that includes the political and administrative units from a central city, and any contiguous, urban political and administrative units with a direct socioeconomic interrelation with the central city, and viceversa". 12 metropolitan areas were identified, containing 25.6% of the national population.

A 1993 study published by Mexico's National Institute of Public Administration (INAP), "Metropolitan and Regional Government and Management", defined a metropolitan area as "the physical or functional union of two or more municipalities that contain a central city and its contiguous locations, or a central city and surrounding locations under its socio-economic influence", and increased the number of metropolitan areas to 37.

In 2004, a joint effort between the National Population Council (CONAPO), INEGI and the Ministry of Social Development (SEDESOL) agreed to officially define metropolitan areas as any of the following:
  a group of two or more municipalities in which a city with a population of at least 50,000 is located in an urban area that extends over the limit of the municipality that originally contained the core city incorporating, physically or under its area of direct influence other adjacent predominantly urban municipalities, all of which either have a high degree of social and economic integration or are relevant for urban politics and administration
 a single municipality in which a city of a population of at least one thousand is located and fully contained (that is, it does not transcend the limits of a single municipality)
 a city with a population of at least 250,000 that forms a conurbation with other cities in the United States.  
The number of metropolitan areas increased to 55 under this criteria.

CONAPO last reviewed the criteria in 2018, and from that date, a metropolitan area in Mexico is defined as:
 a set of two or more municipalities where a city with a population of at least 100,000 is located, and whose urban area, functions and activities exceed the limits of the municipality, incorporating within its area of direct influence the predominantly urban neighboring municipalities, maintaining a high degree of socioeconomic integration. Also included are those municipalities that, due to their particular characteristics, are relevant to urban planning and policy for each metropolitan area.
 municipalities with a city of more than 500,000 inhabitants.
 municipalities with a city of more than 200,000 inhabitants located in the northern and southern border areas and in the coastal zone. 
 municipalities where state capitals are located, if they are not already included in a metropolitan area.
This new criteria also introduced two groups of municipalities within a metropolitan area: core, the location of the core city or cities in the area; and peripheral, surrounding, urban areas with high degree of integration with the core.

As per this last definition, there are currently 74 metropolitan areas in Mexico. 75.1 million people, 62.8% of the country population, live within a metropolitan area.

Northern states are generally divided into a small number of large municipalities, whereas central and southern states are divided into a large number of smaller municipalities. As such, metropolitan areas in the north of the country cover fewer municipalities than those in the central and southern parts.

A few metropolitan areas extend beyond the limits of one state, like Greater Mexico City (Mexico City, Mexico and  Hidalgo), La Laguna (Coahuila and Durango), and Tampico (Tamaulipas and Veracruz).

List of metropolitan areas in Mexico by population

Official name of each metropolitan area, area in square kilometers and number of municipalities from CONAPO.

Population in 2020 from the 2020 Census, population in 2010 from the 2010 Census.

‡ A new municipality, San Quintín, was created out of Ensenada's territory in February 2020.
‡‡ A new municipality, Bacalar, was created out of Othon P. Blanco's territory in February 2011.

Transnational conurbations

The United States shares a 2,000 mi (3,000 km) border with Mexico. It is the most frequently crossed international border in the world, with about 250 million legal crossings every year. The distribution of the population in Mexico, especially, in urban areas, has been changed significantly by the economic interaction between settlements in its north and the United States. The increasing population concentration in the north of Mexico is strongly associated with the development of the maquila industries there and the eventual economic effects of North American Free Trade Agreement (NAFTA).

Metropolitan areas at the border with the US form transnational conurbations with deep economic and demographic interaction. For example, the San Diego – Tijuana metropolitan area consists of San Diego County in the US and the municipalities of Tijuana, Playas de Rosarito, and Tecate in Mexico. The total population of the region has been estimated to be just over 5 million in 2009, making it by far the largest binational metropolitan area shared between the US and Mexico. The National Population Council (CONAPO) recognizes the existence of such metropolitan areas and defines them as the municipalities with a city of at least 200,000 inhabitants and sharing processes of conurbation with cities of the US:

Mexico City megalopolis

A megalopolis is defined as a long chain of continuous metropolitan areas or territories that are relatively integrated amongst each other, a clear example being the Northeast Megalopolis in the United States. In 1996, the Programa General de Desarollo Urbano del Distrito Federal first proposed this concept to refer to the Mexico City megalopolis, or "megalopolis of central Mexico", which was later expanded by PROAIRE, a metropolitan commission on the environment.

Known in Spanish as the corona regional del centro de México (regional ring), the megalopolis of Central Mexico was defined as the consolidation of the metropolitan areas of the Valley of Mexico, Puebla, Cuernavaca, Toluca, Pachuca, Tlaxcala, Tulancingo, Tula, Cuautla and Tianguistenco.

Its population as of 2020 is 30.8 million people, about 25% of the country's total, and it is considered one of the most populated regions in the world.

See also
 Demographics of Mexico
 List of cities in Mexico
 List of most populous cities in Mexico by decade
 List of municipalities in Mexico by population
 List of metropolitan areas by population
 List of metropolitan areas in the Americas by population

Notes

References

External links
 National Population Council (CONAPO) — official website. 
 National Institute of Statistics and Geography (INEGI)  — official website. 

 
Mexico
Metropolitan areas